Khlong Lan is the westernmost district (amphoe) of Kamphaeng Phet province, central Thailand.

History
The area was originally part of Mueang Kamphaeng Phet district, then named Tambon Pong Nam Ron. The tambon Khlong Lan and Pong Nam Ron were upgraded to a minor district (king amphoe) on 1 June 1977. It was officially upgraded to a full district on 20 March 1986.

Geography
Neighboring districts are (from the east clockwise): Mueang Kamphaeng Phet, Khlong Khlung, Pang Sila Thong of Kamphaeng Phet Province; Umphang, Phop Phra and Wang Chao of Tak province.

Administration
The district is divided into four subdistricts (tambons), which are further subdivided into 69 villages (mubans). There are no municipal (thesaban) areas. There are four tambon administrative organizations (TAO).

References

External links
amphoe.com

Khlong Lan